Andrew Kellaway (born 23 November 1975) is a former Australian rules football player who played for the Richmond Football Club in the AFL.

Life
Educated at Caulfield Grammar School, Kellaway joined his brother Duncan at Richmond in 1997, recruited with pick 71. He was a defender, and in his best AFL season, 2000, he won the club's best and fairest award and was a member of the All-Australian Team, at one stage playing 118 games in a row.

He played International rules football for Australia in 2000 and 2002, playing as the goalkeeper in both years. In the latter year he won the Jim Stynes Medal.

He was delisted by Richmond at the end of the 2006 season at age 30, a decision made by the club that surprised many.

In 2011, Kellaway, after a stint as a landscaper, became a firefighter.

Statistics

|-
|- style="background-color: #EAEAEA"
! scope="row" style="text-align:center" | 1998
|style="text-align:center;"|
| 39 || 16 || 0 || 0 || 89 || 111 || 200 || 74 || 34 || 0.0 || 0.0 || 5.6 || 6.9 || 12.5 || 4.6 || 2.1 || 0
|-
! scope="row" style="text-align:center" | 1999
|style="text-align:center;"|
| 39 || 18 || 1 || 4 || 117 || 108 || 225 || 79 || 23 || 0.1 || 0.2 || 6.5 || 6.0 || 12.5 || 4.4 || 1.3 || 0
|- style="background-color: #EAEAEA"
! scope="row" style="text-align:center" | 2000
|style="text-align:center;"|
| 39 || 22 || 12 || 4 || 235 || 145 || 380 || 161 || 36 || 0.5 || 0.2 || 10.7 || 6.6 || 17.3 || 7.3 || 1.6 || 5
|-
! scope="row" style="text-align:center" | 2001
|style="text-align:center;"|
| 39 || 25 || 3 || 1 || 222 || 148 || 370 || 153 || 54 || 0.1 || 0.0 || 8.9 || 5.9 || 14.8 || 6.1 || 2.2 || 0
|- style="background-color: #EAEAEA"
! scope="row" style="text-align:center" | 2002
|style="text-align:center;"|
| 39 || 22 || 4 || 3 || 200 || 137 || 337 || 139 || 47 || 0.2 || 0.1 || 9.1 || 6.2 || 15.3 || 6.3 || 2.1 || 1
|-
! scope="row" style="text-align:center" | 2003
|style="text-align:center;"|
| 39 || 22 || 2 || 1 || 216 || 140 || 356 || 144 || 52 || 0.1 || 0.0 || 9.8 || 6.4 || 16.2 || 6.5 || 2.4 || 0
|- style="background-color: #EAEAEA"
! scope="row" style="text-align:center" | 2004
|style="text-align:center;"|
| 39 || 16 || 1 || 2 || 108 || 79 || 187 || 71 || 21 || 0.1 || 0.1 || 6.8 || 4.9 || 11.7 || 4.4 || 1.3 || 0
|-
! scope="row" style="text-align:center" | 2005
|style="text-align:center;"|
| 39 || 16 || 3 || 0 || 142 || 103 || 245 || 98 || 28 || 0.2 || 0.0 || 8.9 || 6.4 || 15.3 || 6.1 || 1.8 || 0
|- style="background-color: #EAEAEA"
! scope="row" style="text-align:center" | 2006
|style="text-align:center;"|
| 39 || 15 || 4 || 1 || 160 || 78 || 238 || 128 || 34 || 0.3 || 0.1 || 10.7 || 5.2 || 15.9 || 8.5 || 2.3 || 4
|- class="sortbottom"
! colspan=3| Career
! 172
! 30
! 16
! 1489
! 1049
! 2538
! 1047
! 329
! 0.2
! 0.1
! 8.7
! 6.1
! 14.8
! 6.1
! 1.9
! 10
|}

See also
 List of Caulfield Grammar School people

References

External links
 
 
 

1975 births
People educated at Caulfield Grammar School
Living people
Richmond Football Club players
All-Australians (AFL)
Jack Dyer Medal winners
Caulfield Grammarians Football Club players
Australian rules footballers from Victoria (Australia)
Australia international rules football team players